A Hebrew and English Lexicon of the Old Testament, more commonly known  as Brown–Driver–Briggs or BDB (from the name of its three authors) is a standard reference for Biblical Hebrew and Biblical Aramaic, first published in 1906. It is organized by (Hebrew) alphabetical order of three letter roots. It was based on the Hebrew-German lexicon of Wilhelm Gesenius, translated by Edward Robinson. The chief editor was Francis Brown, with the co-operation of Samuel Rolles Driver and Charles Augustus Briggs, hence the name Brown–Driver–Briggs.  Some modern printings have added the Strong's reference numbers for Biblical Hebrew and Aramaic words.

In 2013, semitists Jo Ann Hackett and John Huehnergard received a National Endowment for the Humanities grant to fund creation of a revised and updated electronic version of the BDB; the resulting Biblical Hebrew and Aramaic Lexicon will be available through a website (Semitica Electronica) or via print-on-demand.

See also
 Hebrew and Aramaic Lexicon of the Old Testament
 New American Standard Bible. The "Brown, Driver, Briggs, Gesenius Lexicon" is dubbed "The New American Standard (NAS) Old Testament Hebrew Lexicon" at www.biblestudytools.com.

References

External links
 .
 Concordance and Dictionary – developed by ALHATORAH.ORG, utilizing modified versions of: J. Strong, The Exhaustive Concordance of the Bible (Cincinnati, 1890);  F. Brown, S. R. Driver, and C. A. Briggs, A Hebrew and English Lexicon of the Old Testament (Oxford, 1906);  and the work of D. Troidl generously made available at openscriptures.org (CC BY 4.0)
 Abridged 1994 version with Strong's Code system, via Internet Archive.
 Full-page images of the BDB.
 1939 Reprint edition, via Internet Archive.

Aramaic dictionaries and grammars
Bible dictionaries
English bilingual dictionaries
Hebrew dictionaries